Marauding Scot (sometimes spelt Marauding Scott) is an old English delicacy, with origins in the North East of England. It is made by soaking fruit in Scotch whisky and then heating it to absorb the liquor.

History
There is much speculation about its origin and its rather curious name. Many culinary scholars think the name of the dish is a reference to the frequent invasions of Scots into Northern England before the new Stuart era united the two nations. These attacks began during Roman times, resulting in the building of Hadrian's Wall, and continued throughout the Middle Ages until James I, son of Mary, Queen of Scots, became King of England. The name is a pun on the similarity of 'Scotch' to 'Scot', the idea being that the Scotch has 'invaded' the natural juices of the fruit.

Recipe

"Marauding Scot" is made in a similar way to the Cockney dish "peaches done in Brandy", as mentioned in the 1959 film version of The 39 Steps, namely by taking the fruit, piercing it, then pouring Scotch over it while it is gently heated. There is much debate about the sequence used. Some believe that it is better to pierce it after the heating has taken place, otherwise it would lose its natural flavour, whereas other chefs believe this misses the point slightly. Other chefs suggest that the heating is unnecessary and in fact dries the fruit, spoiling its taste.

Warning: The flammable nature of Scotch means that this dish should be attempted with great caution.

The dish is traditionally served with shortbread, inkeeping with its Scottish reference.

Notoriety

In one of his famous printed sermons of 1549, Thomas, rector of Crawcrook mentions the "Pillaging Scotte" as an evil influence on the young people of the town, who had clearly been using the dish as an early form of hip flask.

The inclusion of Scotch into other recipes to be found throughout the UK is notable, such as a similar dish which is found in Norfolk.

See also

 Newcastle Stotties, another North Eastern recipe.
 Scotch Broth, a recipe which does not contain Whisky.

External links
 Information about border invasions
 Heritage of Scotland
 Recipes using Scotch
 More recipes involving Scotch
 Another recipe using Irish Whiskey

English cuisine